The following highways are numbered 379:

Canada
Saskatchewan Highway 379

Japan
 Japan National Route 379

United States
  Georgia State Route 379 (former)
  Montana Secondary Highway 379
  Nevada State Route 379
  New York State Route 379 (former)
  Ohio State Route 379
  Puerto Rico Highway 379
  Tennessee State Route 379
  Texas State Highway Spur 379
  Virginia State Route 379